Good Karma Brands, LLC (GKB, formerly Good Karma Broadcasting) is an American conglomerate. Based in Beaver Dam, Wisconsin, it has interests in radio broadcasting, sports marketing, retail, and real estate. GKB was founded in 1997 by Craig Karmazin, the son of former Viacom and Sirius XM executive Mel Karmazin. Craig remains the CEO of Good Karma to this day.

The company owns and/or operates radio stations in the states of California, Florida, Illinois, New York, Ohio, and Wisconsin. The majority of its radio stations are ESPN Radio affiliates, and include its New York City, Los Angeles, and Chicago stations—which were sold by The Walt Disney Company to GKB in December 2021.

History
The company was established in August 1997, and GKB would make its first acquisition of radio stations in December of that year with the purchase of stations in its home base of Beaver Dam (WBEV and WXRO) as well as in Columbus, Wisconsin (WTLX).

As time passed, GKB would also eventually purchase stations in Milwaukee, Wisconsin; Madison, Wisconsin; Cleveland, Ohio; and West Palm Beach, Florida, with the majority of these stations having a sports radio format with an ESPN Radio affiliation.

In 2006, GKB opened an interior design/furniture store in Milwaukee called The Home Market, and would later open a second location in Madison, Wisconsin.

In 2011, GKB began to purchase residential properties near Lambeau Field in Green Bay, Wisconsin. The buildings were collectively branded as the "Tundra Trio", and were renovated as upscale properties that can be rented for events.

In 2013, GKB station WKNR ESPN 850 in Cleveland became the AM flagship station for the Cleveland Browns.

In January 2014, to reflect the company's brand extension, GKB officially changed its name from Good Karma Broadcasting to its current name of Good Karma Brands.

On July 17, 2014, it was reported that GKB had purchased a minority ownership stake in the Milwaukee Bucks of the National Basketball Association (NBA).

On July 27, 2018, GKB announced it had reached a deal to acquire WTMJ and WKTI in Milwaukee from the E. W. Scripps Company. WKTI would flip to ESPN Radio.

On August 28, 2019, it was announced by ESPN Radio that day-to-day management of Chicago's WMVP would move from direct purview by ESPN to a management agreement with Good Karma Brands. The station's incumbent general manager, Jim Pastor, retired at the end of the year, with Good Karma beginning to operate the station on September 29, 2019, under a lease with Disney. The lease did not lead to any immediate changes to personnel and facilities. Two years later, on December 13, 2021, Good Karma announced it was acquiring ownership of WMVP outright from Disney; the deal also saw GKB purchase WEPN in New York City and KSPN in Los Angeles. GKB also assumed Disney's local marketing agreement to operate Emmis Communications-owned WEPN-FM in New York City. GKB would pay $15 million for the stations, with $1 million paid at the deal's closing and the rest paid in quarterly installments of $500,000.
The sale of WEPN was closed in March 2022.

List of radio stations

California 

 710 KSPN Los Angeles (Sports–ESPN)

Florida
760 WEFL Tequesta/West Palm Beach (Sports–TUDN)
106.3 WUUB Jupiter/West Palm Beach (Sports–ESPN)

Illinois
1000 WMVP Chicago (Sports–ESPN)

Ohio
850 WKNR Cleveland (Sports–ESPN)
1540 WWGK Cleveland (Silent)

New York
1050 WEPN New York City (Sports–ESPN)
98.7 WEPN-FM New York City (Sports–ESPN; managed by Good Karma Brands, owned by Emmis Communications)

Wisconsin
1430 WBEV Beaver Dam (Sports-ESPN)
95.3 WBEV-FM Beaver Dam (Oldies)
100.5 WTLX Monona/Madison (Sports–ESPN)
620/103.3 WTMJ Milwaukee (Talk/sports)
1510/101.7 WGKB Waukesha/Milwaukee (Black-centric talk)
94.5 WKTI Milwaukee (Sports–ESPN)

Team Radio Networks
Cleveland Browns Radio Network (AM flagship)
Milwaukee Brewers Radio Network
Milwaukee Bucks Radio Network

References

External links

Companies based in Wisconsin
Beaver Dam, Wisconsin
Radio broadcasting companies of the United States
1997 establishments in the United States
Companies established in 1997